The Bahamas competed at the 2004 Summer Olympics in Athens, Greece, from 13 to 29 August 2004. This was the nation's fourteenth appearance at the Olympics, except the 1980 Summer Olympics in Moscow because of the United States boycott.

The Bahamas Olympic Association sent a total of 22 athletes, 13 men and 9 women, to compete only in athletics (the nation's strongest field), swimming, and tennis. The Bahamian team featured numerous athletes who entered the Games as medal contenders in their respective events, including Tonique Williams-Darling, Chandra Sturrup, Debbie Ferguson, and Chris Brown. Sprinter Debbie Ferguson, who helped the Bahamian team claim their first gold medal in the women's 4 × 100 m relay, was appointed by the association to carry the nation's flag in the opening ceremony.

Bahamas left Athens with a total of two individual Olympic medals (a gold and a bronze), summing it up to a stark tally of eight with six more from Sydney. The highlight of the Games for the Bahamian athletes came with a prestigious Olympic gold from Tonique Williams-Darling in the women's 400 metres on August 24, 2004. Meanwhile, Ferguson added a bronze to her career hardware in the women's 200 metres by the following day. Being the oldest athlete to reach the final at age 28, she was quoted after the race as saying "I think per capita, the Bahamas already won the Olympics", referring to the 2 medals won for the nation of approximately 325,000 people.

Medalists

Athletics 

Bahamian athletes have so far achieved qualifying standards in the following athletics events (up to a maximum of 3 athletes in each event at the 'A' Standard, and 1 at the 'B' Standard).
Key
Note–Ranks given for track events are within the athlete's heat only
Q = Qualified for the next round
q = Qualified for the next round as a fastest loser or, in field events, by position without achieving the qualifying target
NR = National record
N/A = Round not applicable for the event
Bye = Athlete not required to compete in round

Men
Track & road events

* Competed only in heats

Field events

Women
Track & road events

Field events

Swimming 

Bahamian swimmers earned qualifying standards in the following events (up to a maximum of 2 swimmers in each event at the A-standard time, and 1 at the B-standard time):

Men

Women

Tennis

See also
 Bahamas at the 2002 Commonwealth Games
 Bahamas at the 2003 Pan American Games

References

External links
Official Report of the XXVIII Olympiad
Bahamas Olympic Association

Nations at the 2004 Summer Olympics
2004
Olympics